Socotora is a genus of small operculate land snails, terrestrial gastropod mollusks in the family Pomatiidae.

Species
 Socotora albicans (G. B. Sowerby I, 1839)
 Socotora auricularis (Gray in Griffith & Pidgeon, 1833)
 Socotora clathratula (Récluz, 1843)
 Socotora helicoides Neubert, 2009
 Socotora naticoides (Récluz, 1843)

References

 Bourguignat, J.-R. (1882). Mission G. Révoil au pays Çomalis. Faune et Flore. Mollusques terrestres et fluviatiles, 1-108 pp., 4 pls + 2 unnumbered pls (anatomy). Paris (Jules Tremblay)
 Bank, R. A. (2017). Classification of the Recent terrestrial Gastropoda of the World. Last update: July 16th, 2017.

Pomatiidae
Gastropod genera